Vitex lignum-vitae, known in Australia as yellow hollywood or "lignum-vitae" (also used for other species), is a rainforest tree of eastern Australia. The natural range of distribution is in dry, sub-tropical or tropical rainforest from the Richmond River, New South Wales to Cape York Peninsula at the northernmost tip of Australia. It also occurs in New Guinea. Lignum vitae is Latin for "wood of life".

Description 
A small to medium tree growing to 30 metres tall and a trunk diameter of 90 cm. The trunk is creamy or brown, with horizontal lines and fissures. Bark sheds in small flakes. Flanged or buttressed at the base of larger trees, the bole is irregular in shape.

Juvenile and coppice leaves lobed or angled. Mature leaves opposite, simple, shiny and not toothed. 5 to 13 cm long, often broader towards the tip.  Leaf stalks 15 to 25 mm long, hairy and channelled on the upper side. Net veins visible on the leaf's underside. Small foveolae (raised hairy bumps) appearing at the junction of the midrib and larger lateral veins. Branchlets grey and hairy, somewhat four angled in cross section.

Pale purple flowers form on cymes at various times of the year. Most often around the month of April. The fruit is red drupe, 8 to 12 mm in diameter with a round hard capsule inside. The capsule has four cells, each containing a fertile or infertile seed. Fruit ripens in the months of November to April. Fruit eaten by birds including the green catbird and rose crowned fruit dove.

Regeneration from seed is remarkably slow and difficult. The fleshy aril should be removed from the fruit capsule. Old fruit is preferred. Roots and shoots may appear after two or more years.

References

  (other publication details, included in citation)

Trees of Australia
lignum-vitae
Lamiales of Australia
Flora of Queensland
Flora of New South Wales
Flora of New Guinea